The Monsters of Morley Manor (sometimes subtitled A Madcap Adventure) is a children's fantasy/sci-fi/horror novel written by Bruce Coville, published in 2001. While it combines many different genres in an unconventional manner, its premise is reminiscent of classic spooky haunted-house stories for children. It was originally serialized in Bruce Coville's series of short story anthologies. For example, one chapter of the story introduces aliens into the plot, and that chapter was published in Bruce Coville's Book of Aliens II. Another chapter features ghosts and was published in Bruce Coville's Book of Ghosts II. An article in Horn Book Magazine mentioned the book as part of a "developing undercurrent of fantastical humor" following the success of Harry Potter.

The story follows that of sixth-grader Anthony and his little sister Sarah. They discover some small figurines of monsters (such as a werewolf, a medusa, and other familiar creatures) in an old abandoned house. But when the figures get wet, they come to life, and later grow to life-size. The boy and other children join them on a quest involving aliens, angels, and ghosts.

The book won a WMLA Sasquatch Reading Award.

Plot
Anthony and his sister Sarah Walker go to an estate sale at Morley Manor after the death of old man Morley (Martin Morley) and buy a small mysterious box. When Anthony manages to get it open he finds five little monster figurines inside. After an incident with a monkey and a bath tub, they discover that the figurines can be brought back to life by just adding water. Once the monsters are revived they reveal themselves to be the owners of the house and kin to Mr. Morley. They are Gaspar, Melisandre, and Ludmilla Morley as well as Albert and the were-human Bob. Anthony and Sarah agree to help them get back to the house and to their appropriate size (and eventually shape). Once that's done Anthony and Sarah are about to leave when a mysterious friend from Gaspar's past appears, the Wentar. He reveals that Gaspar's twin brother did not in fact die, but was abducted by aliens and replaced by a clone when they were young. The characters just start to ask why when the Wentar hears someone coming and they escape through the starry door to a water planet where the Wentar thinks they will get some answers.

After a spell and deep dive they meet an agent of the deadly Flinduvians, Ug. Ug tells them that the Flinduvians kidnapped Martin Morley to study human life and gain an agent on earth. Their findings have led them to want to use earth's ghosts for batteries for some kind of deadly weapon. What this weapon is he can't or won't say. Once back at the starry door they decide to split into two groups, one who will go to the Land of the Dead to warn the dead, and the other to rescue Martin Morley. The Wentar, Ludmilla, and Albert decide to go to Flinduvia, the rest back to Earth. They say their goodbyes and then make their separate paths. Once back on Earth Anthony remembers that the new owner of Morley Manor was going to tear it down that morning. They then rush to change Gaspar and Melisandre back to their human forms, find them decent clothes, and find a lawyer to stall the Manor's destruction. Anthony and Sarah can't keep their eyes open and go to sleep at their house. The next day Anthony wakes and wonders if it was all a dream. Everything is normal. His Grandma is even cooking in the kitchen. There's a knock on the door and Grandma Walker goes to answer. She comes back with Gaspar and Melisandre- not a dream then. After a moment Grandma Walker recognizes Gaspar as the fiancée that disappeared fifty years ago. After explanations are given Grandma Walker insists on going with them to the land of the dead.

That night they all descend deep into the basement of Morley Manor and then go to the Land of the Dead by focusing on the recently deceased Grandpa Walker. Once there they eventually meet up with the Angel of the Land of the Dead, Ivanoma. This being confirms that it has felt souls being ripped from its care, and promises that it will warn the people that it can. With nothing more to do they leave the Land of the Dead, sent along all the faster by the angel. Unfortunately- or perhaps fortunately- the angel made a mistake and sends Grandpa Walker along with. Grandpa lands with Anthony and pleads with Anthony to not reveal his presence, and Anthony doesn't. 
The group ends up wandering upstairs where they find the group that had gone to Flinduvia for Martin. They have succeeded in grabbing Martin- who is still a child. The reunion is somewhat painful, especially for Martin who is eventually knocked out by the Wentar. Both groups share their information, but are left still with the question of how the Flinduvians intend to use the earth's dead. Suddenly a terrible voice offers to explain. Apparently Martin has betrayed them and helped Flinduvians follow them.

The Flinduvian reveals the plot to use earth's dead to power the bodies of dead Flinduvians, making them zombies that can pass in unlimited numbers through the starry door and can conquer any planet. The Flinduvian has a device that can sense ghosts and it picks up on Grandpa Walker. The Flinduvian points a collecting gun at Anthony, but instead of collecting Grandpa Walker he collects Anthony himself. Anthony's spirit is put inside a dead Flinduvian and after a while he realizes that he can, with effort, take control of the body. When he hears the Flinduvians threaten first his grandma and then his sister he is finally given the impetus he needs to take control of the body and fight back long enough that the Wentar can get help from the Coalition of Civilized Worlds. Afterwards Martin manages to help Anthony back into his own body and offers himself as a secret agent on Flinduvia- using the Flinduvian body Anthony had been put into. Grandpa Walker goes back to the Land of the Dead and everyone else goes home.

In the epilogue it is revealed that Gaspar won the legal battle to keep his home. He and Albert fix it up and he invites the Walkers to dinner every once in the while. Anthony also helps him with his experiments. Ludmilla and Melisandre live on the alien planet Zentarazna and occasionally visit. Anthony comes out of the adventure more mature with a healthy dose of respect and appreciation for life and family.

Audio book
Full Cast Audio released the book on CD and on audio cassette, with Bruce Coville as the voice of Gaspar. Director Daniel Bostick voiced several characters, and eleven other voice actors took on the roles of the remaining characters. It was produced by Daniel and Bostick.

References

Text
1. Coville, Bruce. (2001). The Monsters of Morley Manor. Magic Carpet Books. Paperback:

External links
SF Site review

2001 American novels
Children's fantasy novels
Children's science fiction novels
American children's novels
Novels first published in serial form
2001 children's books
American horror novels
Novels by Bruce Coville
Werewolf novels